David Keith Dallas (born 28 August 1982) is a hip hop artist from New Zealand of Samoan and European descent.

Early career 
Dallas began his rapping career under the name Con Psy as a part of the duo Frontline, a producer and MC group along with producer Nick Maclaren. In 2003 he appeared in Scribe's popular single, Not Many – The Remix!. Frontline released their official debut album 'Borrowed Time', in October 2005. The album won the award for 'Best Urban Album' at the 2006 New Zealand Music Awards.

Career 
Dallas' debut solo album, Something Awesome, was released on 31 August 2009. it reached No. 1 on New Zealand's iTunes chart. Something Awesome was awarded Best Urban/Hip Hop album at the 2010 New Zealand Music Awards on 7 October 2010 and was shortlisted for the inaugural Taite Music Prize in 2010.

Dallas' second studio album, The Rose Tint, was initially a free download via his website on 11 May 2011, it was downloaded more than 50,000 times. Due to demand, a deluxe retail edition went on sale in October 2011 and became New Zealand's highest-selling hip-hop album for 2011. The Rose Tint was nominated for 3 New Zealand Music Awards and also shortlisted for the Taite Prize in 2012.

In September 2012, Dallas released the "Buffalo Man" EP as a free download, with all songs inspired by, sampled, or interpolated from Jamiroquai.

In October 2013, Dallas' third studio album Falling into Place was released in New Zealand. It debuted at No. 2 on the New Zealand album charts. Its lead single "Runnin'" was certified platinum as of January 2014. The second single, "The Wire", featuring Ruby Frost was certified Gold as of February 2014. Falling into Place was up for 4 nominations at the 2014 New Zealand Music Awards. Dallas won Best Male Artist and Best Urban/Hip Hop Album at the 2014 New Zealand Music Awards.

Dallas wrote and performed the theme music for Samoan wrestlers The Usos, "So Close Now", which was released on iTunes on 31 October 2011 as part of the WWE Music Group.

Dallas' 2013 single "Runnin'" was used in the trailer for the video game Madden 25 and also features in the video game FIFA 14. It also features in the 2022 Adam Sandler film  Hustle.

Dallas supported Eminem at his first New Zealand show in February 2014 at Western Springs' 'Rapture' event.

Discography

Albums

EPs

Singles

Awards

|-
| rowspan="2" | 2010
| David Dallas – Something Awesome
| Taite Music Prize
|  
|-
| David Dallas – Something Awesome 
| 2010 New Zealand Music Awards – Best Urban/Hip Hop Album
|  
|-
| rowspan="3" | 2011
| David Dallas – The Rose Tint
| 2011 New Zealand Music Awards – Album of the Year
|  
|-
| David Dallas – The Rose Tint
| 2011 New Zealand Music Awards – Best Male Solo Artist
| 
|-
| David Dallas – The Rose Tint
| 2011 New Zealand Music Awards – Best Urban/Hip Hop Album
| 
|-
| rowspan="6" | 2012
| David Dallas – The Rose Tint
| Taite Music Prize
| 
|-
| David Dallas – The Rose Tint
| 2012 Pacific Music Awards – Best Pacific Male Artist
|  
|-
| David Dallas – The Rose Tint
| 2012 Pacific Music Awards – Best Pacific Urban Artist
| 
|-
| David Dallas – "Take A Picture" (D Dallas/A Iustini/J Iustini/T Rowlands/E Simons)
| 2012 Pacific Music Awards – APRA Best Pacific Song
| 
|-
| David Dallas – The Rose Tint
| 2012 Pacific Music Awards – Best Pacific Music Album (Tui Award)
| 
|-
| Special Problems – "Take a Picture" (David Dallas)
| 2012 New Zealand Music Awards – Best Music Video
|  
|-
| rowspan="5" | 2014
| David Dallas – Falling into Place
| Taite Music Prize
| 
|-
| David Dallas – Falling into Place
| 2014 New Zealand Music Awards – Best Urban/Hip Hop Album
|  
|-
| David Dallas – Falling into Place 
| 2014 New Zealand Music Awards – Best Male Artist
| 
|-
| David Dallas – "Runnin" 
| 2014 New Zealand Music Awards – Single of the Year
| 
|-
| Tom Gould – "Runnin" (David Dallas)
| 2014 New Zealand Music Awards – Best Music Video
|   
|}

Notes

References

External links
Official website
David Dallas Facebook Page

1982 births
Living people
New Zealand rappers
New Zealand people of Samoan descent